Arab Dizaji (also Romanized as ‘Arab Dīzajī; also known as ‘Arab Dīzaj, Arāb Dizeh, ‘Arab Dizehsī, ‘Arab-e Dīzaj, and ‘Arab-e Dīzehsī) is a village in Avajiq-e Jonubi Rural District of Dashtaki District of Chaldoran County, West Azerbaijan province, Iran. At the 2006 National Census, its population was 750 in 140 households. The following census in 2011 counted 678 people in 195 households. The latest census in 2016 showed a population of 629 people in 182 households; it was the largest village in its rural district.

References 

Chaldoran County

Populated places in West Azerbaijan Province

Populated places in Chaldoran County